Shamlee, also known as Baby Shamili/Shamlee, (born 10 July 1987), is an Indian actress who has worked in Telugu, Tamil, Kannada, and Malayalam films. Her roles include the  mentally challenged child Anjali in the 1990 film Anjali, for which she won the National Film Award for Best Child Artist, and a child trapped inside a bore-well in the film Malootty, which won her a Kerala State Film Award for Best Child Artist. She has also won the Karnataka State Film Award for Best Child Actor (Female) for her performance in her Kannada debut Mathe Haditu Kogile.

Early life
Shamlee is from a family of actors, being the younger sister to actor Richard Rishi and actress Shalini. She was born to Babu and Alice. Her father migrated to Madras with an ambition of becoming an actor and the family settled there. Later he fulfilled his ambition through his children.

Career
Shamlee started acting at the age of two in Tamil Cinema with the Vijaykanth starrer Rajanadai. In 1990, she acted in Bharathan's Malootty, a film based on Jessica McClure. Her performance won her critical appreciation and the Kerala State Film Award for Best Child Artist. Her breakthrough came with Mani Ratnam's Anjali, in which she portrayed a mentally challenged child, which earned her widespread critical acclaim across South India and the National Film Award for Best Child Artist. At that time, Shamlee was regarded as one of the youngest income tax assessees ever. After Anjali, Shamlee became inarguably the most sought out child artist in South Indian cinema and, thus in subsequent years, acted in many roles in all four South Indian languages.

In 2009, she played her first female lead role in Anand Ranga's directorial debut Oye! (2009) alongside Siddarth with her performance receiving a mixed response. Between 2010 and 2015, Shamili studied and worked in Singapore and later returned to Chennai to work on the production of Veera Shivaji alongside Vikram Prabhu in 2016, which was panned by critics. Her performance also received negative reviews with indiaglitz claiming “Shamlee gets a forgettable debut as a heroine in Tamil. Her lip sync is poor and the scenes involving her do no help her either”. and sify also stating she is “as stiff as a wax statue with barely any emotion”. Shamili also acted in the Malayalam film Valleem Thetti Pulleem Thetti the same year, which was also panned and received negative reviews.

Filmography

As child artist

As lead actress

References

External links
 

|-
! colspan="3" style="background: #DAA520;" | National Film Award
|-

|-

Indian film actresses
Actresses from Chennai
Living people
Actresses in Malayalam cinema
Actresses in Tamil cinema
Actresses in Telugu cinema
Tamil Nadu State Film Awards winners
21st-century Indian actresses
Indian child actresses
Kerala State Film Award winners
Child actresses in Kannada cinema
Child actresses in Tamil cinema
Child actresses in Telugu cinema
Child actresses in Malayalam cinema
Best Child Artist National Film Award winners
1987 births